Braxton Hicks contractions, also known as practice contractions or false labor, are sporadic uterine contractions that may start around six weeks into a pregnancy. However, they are usually felt in the second or third trimester of pregnancy.

Associated conditions
Braxton Hicks contractions are often confused for labor. Braxton Hicks contractions allow the pregnant woman's body to prepare for labor. However, the presence of Braxton Hicks contractions does not mean a woman is in labor or even that labor is about to commence. Another common cause of pain in pregnancy is round ligament pain. 

Table 1. Braxton Hicks contractions vs. True Labor

Pathophysiology
Although the exact causes of Braxton Hicks contractions are not fully understood, there are known triggers that cause Braxton Hicks contractions, such as when a pregnant woman:

 is dehydrated
 has a full bladder
 has just had sexual intercourse
 has been exercising (running, lifting heavy objects) 
 is under excessive stress
 has had her stomach touched

There are two thoughts for why these intermittent uterine muscle contractions may be occurring. The first is that these early “practice contractions” could be helping to prepare the body for true labor by strengthening the uterine muscle. The second is that these contractions may occur when the fetus is in a state of physiological stress, in order to help provide more oxygenated blood to the fetal circulation.

Signs and symptoms
The determination of Braxton Hicks contractions is dependent on the history and physical assessment of the pregnant woman's abdomen, as there are no specific imaging tests for diagnosis. The key is to differentiate Braxton Hicks contractions from true labor contractions (see Table 1 above).

Most commonly, Braxton Hicks contractions are weak and feel like mild cramping that occurs in a localized area in the front abdomen at an infrequent and irregular rhythm (usually every 10-20 minutes), with each contraction lasting up to 2 minutes.  They may be associated with certain triggers and can disappear and reappear; they do not get more frequent, longer, or stronger over the course of the contractions. However, as the end of a pregnancy approaches, Braxton Hicks contractions tend to become more frequent and more intense.

On a physical exam, some uterine muscle tightening may be palpable, but there should be no palpable contraction in the uterine fundus and no cervical changes or cervical dilation. Braxton Hicks contractions do not lead to birth.

More concerning symptoms that may require assessment by a healthcare professional include:

 Any bleeding or fluid leakage from the vagina
 Contractions that are strong, frequent (every 5 minutes), and persisting for an hour
 Changes or significant decreases in fetal movement

Management
Although there is no specific medical treatment for Braxton Hicks contractions, some alleviating factors include:

 Adequate hydration
 Drinking warm milk, herbal tea, or having a small meal
 Urination to empty a full bladder
 Rhythmic breathing
 Lying down on the left side 
 A mild change in movement or activity level 
 Relaxing and de-stressing (e.g., a massage, nap, or warm bath)
 Trying other pain management techniques (e.g., practices from childbirth preparation class)

History
Braxton Hicks contractions are named after John Braxton Hicks, the English physician who first wrote about them in Western medicine. In 1872, he investigated the later stages of pregnancy and noted that many pregnant women felt contractions without being near birth. He examined the prevalence of uterine contractions throughout pregnancy and determined that contractions that do not lead to labor are a normal part of pregnancy.

References

Childbirth